Obereopsis quadrinotaticollis is a species of beetle in the family Cerambycidae. It was described by Stephan von Breuning in 1949. It is known from Myanmar.

Subspecies
 Obereopsis quadrinotaticollis quadrinotaticollis Breuning, 1949
 Obereopsis quadrinotaticollis lachungi Breuning, 1982

References

quadrinotaticollis
Beetles described in 1949